David Beniamin Lazar (born 8 August 1991) is a Romanian footballer who plays as a goalkeeper for Liga I club CS Universitatea Craiova.

International career
In October 2020, he had first called up to the senior side for the play off euro 2020 qualifying against Iceland and nations league against Norway and Austria .

Honours

Astra Giurgiu
Cupa României runner-up: 2018–19, 2020–21

Universitatea Craiova
Supercupa României: 2021

References

External links

UEFA profile

1991 births
Living people
People from Bihor County
Romanian footballers
Romania under-21 international footballers
Romania international footballers
Association football goalkeepers
Liga I players
Liga II players
CSU Voința Sibiu players
CS Pandurii Târgu Jiu players
FC Botoșani players
FC Astra Giurgiu players
CS Universitatea Craiova players
Danish 1st Division players
Vejle Boldklub players
Romanian expatriate sportspeople in Denmark
Romanian expatriate footballers
Expatriate men's footballers in Denmark